In Search of Sunrise 9: India is a compilation album by Dutch trance producer Richard Durand. It was released on 6 June 2011 by SongBird. It is the ninth installment in the In Search of Sunrise compilation series. On 31 May 2011 Richard Durand released a 35-second teaser preview of the compilation on MySpace.

Track listing

References

External links 
 In Search of Sunrise 9: India at Black Hole Official Online Store
 

Electronic compilation albums
2011 compilation albums